Tapuaeta cay is one of 22 islands in the Aitutaki atoll of the Cook Islands. It is a sand cay located on the eastern perimeter of Aitutaki Lagoon, to the west of Tapuaetai, and is 190m long and up to 70m wide.

References

Islands of Aitutaki